Carex amplifolia is a species of sedge known by the common name bigleaf sedge. It is native to western North America from British Columbia to Montana to California, where it grows in wet and seasonally wet areas in coniferous forests.

Description
This rhizomatous sedge produces stems 50 to 100 centimeters tall. The winged stems have reddish tinted bases and are wrapped in long, roughly hairy leaves up to 2 centimeters wide. The inflorescence is made up of 5 to 8 cylindrical spikes each up to 10 or 14 centimeters long and often made up of hundreds of individual flowers.

External links
Jepson Manual Treatment - Carex amplifolia
USDA Plants Profile; Carex amplifolia
Flora of North America
Carex amplifolia - Photo gallery

amplifolia
Flora of British Columbia
Flora of the Northwestern United States
Flora of California
Flora of Nevada
Flora of New Mexico
Plants described in 1839
Flora without expected TNC conservation status